Walter Scott (23 June 1932 — 6 June 1988) was a Scottish footballer, who played for Falkirk, Hamilton Academical, Dumbarton and Halifax Town.

References

1932 births
Scottish footballers
Falkirk F.C. players
Hamilton Academical F.C. players
Dumbarton F.C. players
Scottish Football League players
English Football League players
1988 deaths
Association football goalkeepers
Halifax Town A.F.C. players
Scottish Junior Football Association players
Footballers from South Lanarkshire
People from Douglas, South Lanarkshire